Clara Nunes is the sixth album by Clara Nunes. Originally released in 1973, it was later reissued in 2004 as part of a Clara Nunes boxset that featured her entire discography reissued on CD for the first time.

Track listing
 "Tristeza pé no chão"
 "Fala viola "
 "Minha festa"
 "Umas e outras"
 "Pra esquecer"
 "Arlequim de bronze"
 "O mais que perfeito"
 "Quando vim de Minas"
 "Meu Carirí"
 "Homenagem à Olinda, Recife e Pai Edu "
 "É doce morrer no mar"
 "Valeu pelo amor"
 "Eu preciso de silêncio"
 "Apesar de você"

References

1973 albums
Clara Nunes albums